Metacrocea is a genus of moths in the subfamily Arctiinae. It contains the single species Metacrocea postflava, which is found in Costa Rica and Brazil.

References

Natural History Museum Lepidoptera generic names catalog

Arctiinae